The Kansas City Terminal Railway Company Roundhouse Historic District, in Kansas City, Missouri, is a historic district which was listed on the National Register of Historic Places in 2001.  The listing included four contributing buildings, two contributing structures, and a contributing sites.

It is a  complex.

References

Railway turntables
Railway buildings and structures on the National Register of Historic Places in Missouri
Historic districts on the National Register of Historic Places in Missouri
National Register of Historic Places in Jackson County, Missouri
Buildings and structures completed in 1914
Railway buildings and structures in Missouri

Railroad roundhouses in Missouri